The Ohio Moline Plow Building is a historic building in the Arena District in Downtown Columbus, Ohio. It was listed on the National Register of Historic Places in 1999. The building was built in 1913 as an office, warehouse, and sales space for the Ohio Moline Plow Company, part of the Moline Plow Company based in Illinois. It is located in a former warehouse district, which once held numerous buildings of similar size, scale, and materials. In the late 20th century, most of the buildings were demolished. The building is also significant for its design integrity and materials, with original patterned brickwork and stone trim, and glass and wood office partitioning.

See also
 National Register of Historic Places listings in Columbus, Ohio

References

External links

Commercial buildings on the National Register of Historic Places in Ohio
Commercial buildings completed in 1913
National Register of Historic Places in Columbus, Ohio
Columbus Register properties
Buildings in downtown Columbus, Ohio